Turbonilla subulina is a species of sea snail, a marine gastropod mollusk in the family Pyramidellidae, the pyrams and their allies.

Distribution
This species occurs in the following locations:
 European waters (ERMS scope)

References

 Monterosato T. A. (di) (1889 (1 gennaio)). Coquilles marines marocaines. Journal de Conchyliologie 37(1): 20-40; 37(2): 112-121

External links
 To Biodiversity Heritage Library (2 publications)
 To CLEMAM
 To Encyclopedia of Life
 To GenBank
 To World Register of Marine Species

subulina
Gastropods described in 1889